The 1972 Orange Bowl was the 38th edition of the college football bowl game, played at the Orange Bowl in Miami, Florida, on Saturday, January 1. The final game of the 1971–72 bowl season, it matched the top-ranked Nebraska Cornhuskers of the Big Eight Conference and the #2 Alabama Crimson Tide of the Southeastern Conference (SEC). Both teams were undefeated; Nebraska, the defending national champion, built a large lead in the first half and won

Teams

Alabama

Nebraska

Game summary
Six-point favorite Nebraska entered the game on a 31-game unbeaten streak, and scored first on a two-yard touchdown run by Jeff Kinney. Future Heisman Trophy winner Johnny Rodgers scored on a 77-yard punt return on the final play of the first quarter, as Nebraska led  In the second quarter, quarterback Jerry Tagge and Gary Dixon added touchdown runs of one and two yards respectively, as Nebraska led convincingly 28–0 with over eight minutes remaining in the first half. There was no additional scoring before halftime as the Husker defense stifled the Tide's previously potent Wishbone offense with All-American running back Johnny Musso.

In the third quarter, Bama's Terry Davis scored on a three–yard touchdown run making the score  eliminating the shutout. Nebraska's Rich Sanger kicked a 21-yard field goal at the end of the third quarter, and a one-yard touchdown run by reserve senior QB Van Brownson made the final score 

With top-ranked Nebraska's 32-point victory, the 1972 Orange Bowl was one of the most lopsided meetings of #1 vs #2, specifically in a season-ending bowl game.

Scoring
First quarter
Nebraska – Jeff Kinney 1-yard run (kick failed), 3:01
Nebraska – Johnny Rodgers 77-yard punt return (Maury Damkroger pass from Jerry Tagge), 0:00
Second quarter
Nebraska – Tagge 1-yard run (Rich Sanger kick), 12:43
Nebraska – Gary Dixon 2-yard run (Sanger kick), 8:49
Third quarter
Alabama  – Terry Davis 2-yard run (run failed), 5:49
Nebraska – Sanger 21-yard field goal, 0:00
Fourth quarter
Nebraska – Van Brownson 1-yard run (Sanger kick), 4:45

Statistics
{| class=wikitable style="text-align:center"
! Statistics !!  Alabama  !! Nebraska
|-
|align=left|First Downs	||16	||15
|-
|align=left|Rushes–yards||58–241||47–133
|-
|align=left|Passing yards||47	||159
|-
|align=left|Passes (C–A–I)||3–13–2||11–20–0
|-
|align=left|Total Offense||71–288 ||67–292
|- 
|align=left|Punts–average||7–43.3||5–42.4
|- 
|align=left|Fumbles–lost ||5–2	||3–2
|-
|align=left|Turnovers||4||2
|-
|align=left|Yards penalized||4–58||4–50
|-
|}

Final polls
Nebraska  was first in both major polls and was the consensus national champion, having defeated the next three teams in the final AP Poll released on January 3: Oklahoma, Colorado, 
The Huskers earned all 55 first-place votes in the AP poll; in the UPI coaches poll released in early December, they received 29 of the 31 first-place votes, with the other two

References

External links
 HuskerPedia.com - 1972 Orange Bowl
 Starting rosters

1971–72 NCAA football bowl games
1972
1972
1972
January 1972 sports events in the United States
Orange Bowl